Gersdorffite is a nickel arsenic sulfide mineral with formula NiAsS. It crystallizes in the isometric system showing diploidal symmetry. It occurs as euhedral to massive opaque, metallic grey-black to silver white forms. Gersdorffite belongs to a solid solution series with cobaltite, CoAsS. Antimony freely substitutes also leading to ullmannite, NiSbS. It has a Mohs hardness of 5.5 and a specific gravity of 5.9 to 6.33.

Gersdorffite has three crystallisation forms: Gersdorffite-P213 (NiAsS), Gersdorffite-Pa3 (Ni(As,S)2) and Gersdorffite-Pca21 (NiAsS). Gersdorffite occurs as a hydrothermal vein mineral along with other nickel sulfides. Associated minerals include nickeline, nickel-skutterudite, cobaltite, ullmannite, maucherite, löllingite, platinum-group minerals, millerite, pyrite, marcasite, and chalcopyrite.

Gersdorffite was first described in 1843 and named in 1845 for Johann von Gersdorff (1781–1849), owner of the nickel mine at Schladming, Austria the type locality.

References

 Palache, C., H. Berman, and C. Frondel (1944) Dana's system of mineralogy, (7th edition), v. I, pp. 298–300
Webmineral data
Mindat with location data
Mineral Data Publishing PDF
 

Sulfosalt minerals
Nickel minerals
Arsenic minerals
Orthorhombic minerals
Minerals in space group 29
Cubic minerals
Minerals in space group 198
Minerals in space group 205
Minerals described in 1845